Yami ni Chiru Sakura (闇ニ散ル桜) is the third maxi single by Japanese band Alice Nine. It was released on April 27, 2005. The single was released with a DVD containing the music video for "Yami ni Chiru Sakura." The second track, "Byakuya ni Kuroneko," was an earlier song created when vocalist Shou and guitarist Tora were in their previous band, Givuss.

Both songs on the single were later released on Alice Nine's third EP, Kasou Musou Shi.

Track list
 "Yami ni Chiru Sakura" (闇ニ散ル桜; Cherry Blossoms Scattered in the Darkness) – 4:12
 "Byakuya ni Kuroneko" (白夜ニ黒猫; Black Cat in the White Night) – 4:52

DVD
 "Yami ni Chiru Sakura" (闇ニ散ル桜; Cherry Blossoms Scattered in the Darkness)

References

External links
 PS Company Official Website
 King Records' Official Website

2005 singles
Alice Nine songs
2005 songs
King Records (Japan) singles
Song articles with missing songwriters